Haixinsha may refer to:

Haixinsha Island (Tianhe District), in Guangzhou, Guangdong, China
Haixinsha Island (Haizhu District), in Guangzhou, Guangdong, China